"A Little Night Music" is the fourth episode of the second season of the American television drama series The Americans, and the 17th overall episode of the series.  It originally aired on FX in the United States on March 19, 2014.

Plot
Claudia gives the Jennings two assignments — one to capture Anton Baklanov, a defector from the Soviet Union whose research is key to helping the US develop stealth technology, and another to get close to Andrew Larrick, the primary suspect in the Connors' murders. Philip monitors Baklanov, while Elizabeth must use naval recruit Brad Mullen to get information about Larrick.
After meeting him at a music store, she gains Mullen's sympathy with a fake story about being raped by Larrick at a bar and how the rape was covered up by the military. She manipulates Mullen into offering to get her the files on Larrick, however, Mullen fears being caught obtaining the files. When the Jennings attempt to abduct Baklanov, they are attacked by two assailants - after a fight, one drives off with Baklanov in the trunk and the other is captured. Meanwhile, fallout from Vladimir Kosygin's death may affect Agent Gaad's job; Oleg's family influence gets him a higher security clearance which allows him to access Nina's field reports. Paige's new friend Kelly takes her to a church function causing Philip and Elizabeth to be dismayed by Paige's new signs of Christian faith.

Production
The episode was written by Stephen Schiff and directed by Lodge Kerrigan.

Reception
The A.V. Club gave the episode a 'B+'. The episode was watched by 1.39 million viewers.

References

External links
 "A Little Night Music" at FX
 

The Americans (season 2) episodes
2014 American television episodes